Ibrahim "Teteh" Bangura (born 27 December 1989 in Freetown) is an unattached Sierra Leonean football striker.

Career

Kallon F.C.
Bangura began his career in his native Sierra Leone, playing with F.C. Kallon. He was the leading goal scorer in the Sierra Leone National Premier League and Sierra Leone FA Cup for the 2006–07 season, and participated in European trials A.C. Milan and Swedish club BK Häcken, but was not offered a contract by either team.

Cleveland City Stars
Bangura joined the Cleveland City Stars of the USL First Division in 2009, and was then sent on loan to Cascade Surge of the USL Premier Development League. He scored a hat-trick on his debut for Cascade on 22 May 2009, in a game against Spokane Spiders.

Köping FF
On 18 July 2010, the Swedish club Köping FF – a fourth tier club struggling against relegation – announced that Bangura was on trial with them. The trial was successful and he made his debut away against Eskilstuna City FK. He scored one goal in that game. His home debut was against the league leaders IK Frej, a 3–3 tie in which Bangura scoring all three goals for the home team.

AIK
On 27 September AIK signed Bangura for three years starting, 1 January 2011. In the 2011 season, he scored 15 goals in 17 games and made 3 assists. In summer 2011, he signed for Bursaspor.

Beitar Jerusalem
On 31 August 2013 Bangura entered for the 1st time into a game vs. Maccabi Petah Tikva, as a substitute, and helped the club to win its first win in 2013–14 season. on 29 September 2013 he scored his 1st goal, and alter was shown a red card by the referee in a game vs. Hapoel Ra'anana that ended in 2-2 draw. On 2 November 2013, Bangura scored 2 goals in a game vs. Bnei Yehuda Tel Aviv when Beitar Jerusalem won 2-1. Later Bangura suffered and Injury. He left Beitar Jerusalem in January 2014.

Career statistics
.

International
Bangura was called up to the Sierra Leone national team for a World Cup qualifier with Equatorial Guinea on 6 September 2008, but did not see any minutes.

References

External links
 CCS bio
 
 

1983 births
Living people
Sportspeople from Freetown
Sierra Leonean footballers
Sierra Leonean expatriate footballers
Sierra Leone international footballers
Association football forwards
Cleveland City Stars players
Cascade Surge players
MD FF Köping players
AIK Fotboll players
USL First Division players
USL League Two players
Israeli Premier League players
Sierra Leonean expatriate sportspeople in the United States
Expatriate footballers in Sweden
Expatriate footballers in Turkey
Expatriate footballers in Israel
Expatriate soccer players in the United States
Bursaspor footballers
Süper Lig players
Allsvenskan players
Superettan players
Division 2 (Swedish football) players
Sierra Leonean expatriate sportspeople in Turkey
Sierra Leonean expatriate sportspeople in Sweden
Beitar Jerusalem F.C. players